Hadley is an unincorporated community in Mercer County, Pennsylvania, United States.

Hadley has a post office, which uses ZIP code 16130.

History
David Hadley came to Perry Township in 1843. While he was a shoemaker, he took an active part in clearing his lands and building mills. As a result, when the Lake Shore Railroad was built across the township and a station erected on land he donated, the locality was named Hadley in honor of his contributions. 

The Hadley post office was established in May 1868, with David Pattison as postmaster. Several years later, the town was platted. A barrel factory was established in 1868, and became an important early industry. Hadley Presbyterian Church was organized in 1875; its building was dedicated the following year. A Methodist church was organized in 1882; its congregation erected a place of worship in 1884.

David Luse Hadley (b. Dec. 9, 1806 - d. Dec. 2, 1884 age 77 yrs.)

Trivia
Captain John H. Miller, Tom Hanks's character in Saving Private Ryan, was from this town.

References

Unincorporated communities in Mercer County, Pennsylvania